Dufftown distillery is a Scotch whisky distillery in Dufftown, Banffshire, Scotland.

Founded in 1895 as "Dufftown-Glenlivet Distillery", the distillery is currently owned by Diageo.

Its Speyside whisky is a component in Arthur Bell & Sons Ltd blended bottlings.

It also markets single malt scotch whiskies under the names Singleton of Dufftown and Dufftown Aged 15 Years.

Other active distilleries in Dufftown include Balvenie, Glendullan, Glenfiddich, Kininvie and Mortlach.

See also
 List of whisky brands
 List of distilleries in Scotland

References

External links
 Spirit of Speyside

Distilleries in Scotland
Diageo
Scottish malt whisky